Chiu Chun Kit (born 4 October 1983) is a former Hong Kong professional footballer who played as a centre-back.

International career
Chiu made his international debut for Hong Kong on 14 November 2012 against Malaysia. He replaced Cheng Siu Wai on the 84th minute.

As of 6 February 2013

External links
 
 Chiu Chun Kit at HKFA
 Player Information on SouthChinaFC.com 
 Chiu Chun Kit profile on Citizen FC official website 

1983 births
Living people
Hong Kong First Division League players
Hong Kong Premier League players
Hong Kong footballers
Tai Po FC players
Hong Kong Rangers FC players
South China AA players
Citizen AA players
Yuen Long FC players
Lee Man FC players
Hong Kong international footballers
Association football defenders